Sa Re Ga Ma Pa L'il Champs 2009 (SRGMP) is the third season of the popular ZeeTV show Sa Re Ga Ma Pa L'il Champs. Going on air from 5 June 2009, the music reality show will feature 12 participants: 6 boys and 6 girls. The theme of the show this year is unique - Jeetenge World, Boys Ya Girls. The eliminations by public voting began on 5 August 2009. The season finale was held in Mumbai on Saturday 24 October 2009; the winner was Hemant Brijwasi.

Judges 
 Abhijeet Bhattacharya - Boys' Mentor
 Alka Yagnik - Girls' Mentor

Guests 
 Kailash Kher - 26 and 27 June
 Saif Ali Khan, Deepika Padukone, Pritam (to promote their movie Love Aaj Kal) - 3 July
 Pritam Imtiaz Ali Zaynah Vastani - 4 July
 Shaan - 10 and 11 July
 Kavita Krishnamurthy - 17 and 18 July
 Imran Khan, Ravi Kishan (to promote their movie Luck), and Udit Narayan - 24 July 
 Udit Narayan - 25 July
 Sukhwinder Singh - 31 July and 1 August - Friendship Special
 Jatin Pandit, Suresh Wadkar, (to serve as the selection board for the Wild Card Entry) - 7 and 8 August
 Shahid Kapoor (to promote his movie KamineyKaminey) - 14 August
 Daler Mehndi, Shreyas Talpade (to promote Shreyas' movie Aage Se Right) - 22 August
 David Dhawan,  Govinda,  Vashu Bhagnani,  Sameer,  Neeraj Shridhar,  Anushka Manchanda, &  Shravan (to promote Govinda's movie Do Knot Disturb) - 28 August
 Wadali brothers - 29 August
 Anandji Virji Shah, Mohammed Zahur Khayyam - 4 September
 Priyanka Chopra, Harman Baweja (to promote their movie What's Your Raashee?) -  5 September
 Asha Bhosle - 11 September
 Salman (Mohammed Ghouse) - 18 September
 Bappi Lahiri - 19 September
 Ratan Rajput & Manoj Tiwari - 24 September
 Emran Hashmi, Soha Ali Khan (to promote their film Tum Mile) - 25 September
 Sanjay Dutt, Ajay Devgan (to promote their movie All the Best: Fun Begins) - 2 October
 Zayed Khan (to promote his movie Blue) - 3 October
 Ritesh Deshmukh (to promote his movie Aladin) - 9 October
 Lara Dutta (to promote her film Blue) - 10 October
 Vishal–Shekhar (Vishal Dadlani & Shekhar Ravjiani) - 17 October
 Sukirti Kandpal, Abhishek Rawat, Priya Marathe to cheer the winner and also Ajay Devgn, Salman Khan and Asin (to promote their movie London Dreams - Finale

Hosts 

The hosts are 2 little kids. Afsha at first was auditioning as a contestant, and ended up being the hostess. Dhairya was already famous from few movies like: Partner (2007 film) and Baabul. Also from shows: Kya Aap Paanchvi Pass Se Tez Hain? and Ek Se Badhkar Ek.
 Afsha Musani
 Dhairya Sorecha

Elimination Table

Bottom 3 

21 August:
 Abhijeet Srivastava - OUT
 Shreyasi Bhattacharjee - Safe
 Shristi Bhandari - Safe

28 August:
 Shristi Bhandari - OUT
 Hemant Brijwasi - Safe
 Rahul Dutta - Safe

4 September:
 Rahul Dutta - OUT
 Prateeksha Shrivastav - Safe
 Antara Nandy - Safe

11 September: NO ELIMINATION (on Asha Bhosle's request)
 Hemant Brijwasi
 Antara Nandy
 Swarit Shukl

18 September:
 Abhigyan Das - Safe
 Shreyasi Bhattacharjee - Safe
 Antara Nandy - OUT

25 September: NO ELIMINATION
 Yatarth Ratnam Rastogi
 Prateeksha Shrivastava

2 October:
 Abhigyan Das - OUT
 Swarit Shukl - Safe

9 October:
 Prateeksha Shrivastava - OUT
 Hemant Brijwasi - Safe

16 October:
 Swarit Shukl - OUT

2009 Grand FINALE 
 Hemant Brijwasi (from Mathura) - WINNER
 Yatharth Ratnum Rastogi (from Varanasi) - 1st runner-up
 Shreyasi Bhattacharjee (from Kolkata) - 2nd runner-up

References

External links 
 Zee TV's Official Site for L'il Champs 2009

Sa Re Ga Ma Pa
2009 Indian television seasons
Zee TV original programming